Pardosa roscai is a wolf spider species in the genus Pardosa found in Bulgaria, Romania and Turkey.

See also 
 List of Lycosidae species

References

External links 

roscai
Spiders of Europe
Arthropods of Turkey
Spiders described in 1951